The Weltmeister W6 is a battery electric mid-size crossover SUV that is manufactured by the Chinese NEV manufacturer WM Motor (Chinese: 威马汽车) under the brand Weltmeister. Mass production of the W6 began in January 2021.

Overview

The design of the Weltmeister W6 was originally previewed by the Weltmeister Evolve Concept during the 2019 Auto Shanghai.

The production version W6 was developed in cooperation with Baidu, and is equipped with unmanned autonomous parking technology. The W6 is capable of performing self-driving functions under specific scenarios using Baidu’s Apollo platform. The Apollo platform feature a Qualcomm 8155 chipset, 5G connectivity, seven cameras, five radars and 12 ultrasonic sensors.

References

Compact sport utility vehicles
Crossover sport utility vehicles
Production electric cars
Cars introduced in 2021
Cars of China